Hong Kong Season Play-off for the 2012–13 football season was held in May 2013. All matches took place at Mong Kok Stadium in Mong Kok, Kowloon.

The play-off semi-finals are played in one match each, contested by the teams who finished in 2nd and 3rd place in the First Division League table, the winners of the Senior Challenge Shield and the champions of the FA Cup. The winners of the semi-finals go through to the finals, with the winner of the final gaining participation for the 2014 AFC Cup group stage.

Qualified teams

First Division League

The teams with final position between 2nd and 5th inclusively guaranteed places in the play-off.

Qualified teams:
Kitchee
Tuen Mun
Southern

Senior Challenge Shield

The winners of the Senior Challenge Shield guaranteed a place in the play-off.

Winners:
Wofoo Tai Po

FA Cup

The winners of the FA Cup will guarantee a place in the play-off.

Winners:
Kitchee

Note: Since Kitchee won the FA Cup champions, the 4th place in the league (i.e. Southern) is guaranteed a place in the play-offs, as Kitchee have qualified to the play-off.

Calendar

Bracket

Fixtures and results

Semi-finals

Tuen Mun vs Wofoo Tai Po

MATCH OFFICIALS
Assistant referees:
Cheng Oi Cho
Chan Shui Hung
Fourth official: Lau Fong Hei
LP Local Player
FP Foreign Player

MATCH RULES
90 minutes. (1st Half Added Time: 3 mins, 2nd Half Added Time: 5 mins)
30 minutes of extra-time if necessary.
Penalty shoot-out if scores still level.
Seven named substitutes
Maximum of 3 substitutions.

Kitchee vs Southern

MATCH OFFICIALS
Assistant referees:
Chow Chun Kit
Yu Chun San
Fourth official: Luk Kin Sun
LP Local Player
FP Foreign Player

MATCH RULES
90 minutes. (1st Half Added Time: 1 min, 2nd Half Added Time: 5 mins)
30 minutes of extra-time if necessary.
Penalty shoot-out if scores still level.
Seven named substitutes
Maximum of 3 substitutions.

Final

MATCH OFFICIALS
Assistant referees:
Chung Ming Sang
Lam Nai Kei
Fourth official: Cheng Oi Cho
LP Local Player
FP Foreign Player

MATCH RULES
90 minutes. (1st Half Added Time: 2 mins, 2nd Half Added Time: 2 mins)
30 minutes of extra-time if necessary.
Penalty shoot-out if scores still level.
Seven named substitutes
Maximum of 3 substitutions.

Scorers
The scorers in the 2013 Hong Kong AFC Cup play-offs are as follows:

2 goals
  Daniel Goulart Quevedo (Tuen Mun)

1 goal

  Chan Man Fai (Kitchee)
  Huang Yang (Kitchee)
  Jordi Tarrés (Kitchee)
  Matt Lam (Kitchee)
  Yago González (Kitchee)
  Aender Naves Mesquita (Wofoo Tai Po)

External links
 Season Playoff - Hong Kong Football Association

Football competitions in Hong Kong
Season Play-off